St. Boniface Catholic Church is a historic Roman Catholic church at Fulda in Harrison Township, Spencer County, Indiana. Built from 1861 to 1865, it is a one-story, Romanesque Revival style brick church with a semi-circular apse, on a sandstone block foundation, and measures 55 x 139 feet (18 x 42 meters). It has a 150 foot tall entrance tower with spire.

The church was listed on the National Register of Historic Places in 1980.

References

External links
Church website

Churches on the National Register of Historic Places in Indiana
Romanesque Revival architecture in Indiana
Roman Catholic churches completed in 1865
Buildings and structures in Spencer County, Indiana
National Register of Historic Places in Spencer County, Indiana
19th-century Roman Catholic church buildings in the United States